Matthew Allen "Matt" Towery is an American political analyst and pollster, television commentator, attorney, and former Georgia state legislator.

In late 2014, Towery encouraged Donald Trump to run for the US presidency, suggesting he would be a serious contender. His polls were among the few to call the 2016 presidential race for Trump over Democratic nominee Hillary Clinton.

Education 
Towery earned a Juris Doctor from Stetson University in 1987 and a Master's in Philosophy from Cambridge.

Career
Towery served in the Georgia House of Representatives and was the Republican nominee for Lt. Governor of Georgia in 1990. He served as Chairman of then-Speaker Newt Gingrich's political organization in the 1990s.

He has appeared on news networks and on The O'Reilly Factor and Hardball with Chris Matthews and with hosts Sean Hannity and Bill Maher. In 2011 he served as a weekly guest commentator for CNN. He has been a political analyst for the Fox affiliate in Atlanta.

In 2014, Towery predicted Donald Trump could become a serious contender for the U.S. presidency. His polling company was one of few to predict a Trump win over Clinton in 2016. Towery wrote a memo detailing the reasons he thought other pollsters were missing likely Trump voters, including over-representing Democrats and under-representing white men, and saying the other polls "were being weighted based on a conventional turnout in a very unconventional year and there is a ‘Trump vote’ that most pollsters just are not able to capture." Hannity read the memo on-air just before the election, which Trump won.

The day before the 2020 US presidential election, Towery again predicted a win for Donald Trump, saying he believed other pollsters were missing "the average guy on the street." He also predicted that Trump would carry Georgia by seven percent, but Joe Biden narrowly won the state.

As of 2020 he was Of Counsel with Hall, Booth, Smith in their Atlanta office.

Personal life
Towery lives with his wife in Atlanta, Georgia and Snell Isle in St. Petersburg, Florida. He has two adult children.

References

External links

Living people
People from Atlanta
Alumni of the University of Cambridge
Stetson University College of Law alumni
Members of the Georgia House of Representatives
Pace Academy alumni
Year of birth missing (living people)